The Malutang Dam is a concrete-face rock-fill dam (CFRD) on the Panlong River in Malipo County, Yunnan Province, China. The primary purpose of the dam is hydroelectric power generation and the power plant was constructed in two stages. Construction on Stage I began in 2002 and the first of 50 MW Francis turbine-generators was commissioned in October 2004, the second in January 2005. Stage II's power station contains three 100 MW Francis turbine generators. Construction on Stage II began in August 2005 and the reservoir began to fill in October 2009. In December 2009, the first 100 MW generator was operational and the last two by May 2010. Malutang Dam's reservoir submerged the Stage I dam but the Stage II intake tower receives water for both stages, allowing Stage I to continue to operate.

See also

List of dams and reservoirs in China
List of major power stations in Yunnan

References

Dams in China
Hydroelectric power stations in Yunnan
Concrete-face rock-fill dams
Dams completed in 2009
Buildings and structures in Wenshan Zhuang and Miao Autonomous Prefecture